Woodville-West Torrens Football Club is an Australian rules football club playing in the South Australian National Football League (SANFL). It was formed in 1990 from an amalgamation of the neighbouring Woodville and West Torrens football clubs and played its inaugural game in 1991.  Since 1993, the Eagles have played most of their home games at Woodville's home ground of Woodville Oval, having previously used Football Park.  They also play two or three games per season at their pre-season base of Thebarton Oval, a ground which has six light towers that the club has upgraded in 2012 to allow night games at the ground for the first time since the 1983 Escort Cup Grand Final (a game won by West Torrens).

History
West Torrens had competed in the SANFL since the 1895 SAFA season, when it was originally known as the Port Natives (who wore Blue and Gold) and renamed to West Torrens for the 1897 SAFA season, while Woodville entered the competition for 1964 SANFL season. However, a third western suburbs team in the competition West Adelaide proved too much to handle with both sides struggling on the field following Woodville's inception.

Heading into 1964, West Torrens had won four premierships in the previous forty seasons, and were a highly competitive club, regular finalists, and played off in 8 Grand Finals - the last one being the 1953 victory over Port Adelaide.

Woodville did not win a premiership or play in a grand final in their twenty-seven seasons (1964–90), usually being close to or on the bottom of the ladder. West Torrens were also dragged down to this level by the 1970s.

Whispers had grown throughout SA football circles that a merger would save these clubs throughout the 1980s.

In 1990, the imminent admission of the Adelaide Crows into the AFL placed both club's futures as separate entities in serious doubt: West Torrens was technically insolvent, 
with debts of $1.1 million, and while Woodville was financially viable, club officials realised that it would be difficult, if not impossible, for the club to be competitive in the foreseeable future.

It was decided at the end of the season to merge the two sides to form the Woodville-West Torrens Eagles, effectively returning to how things were prior to 1964. The club would play their home games at Woodville's home ground, Woodville Oval, and use the West Torrens Eagle emblem. The new club proved immediately competitive, and won their first premiership in 1993.

In accepting the Thomas Seymour Hill Trophy for the first time for the Eagles, captain Peter Schwarz jubilantly proclaimed:

"This is a very sweet moment – the end result of two clubs that made a lot of tough decisions three years ago.  This is for Woodville and for West Torrens.  Now we are one club."

The club colours of blue, gold and green incorporate the club colours of West Torrens (blue and gold) and Woodville (green and gold). The Eagle logo of the West Torrens Football Club was adopted as the official emblem of Woodville West Torrens. It was also agreed that blue would be the primary colour of the merged club.

It took 27 years, but order was finally restored for SANFL clubs in the western suburbs in 1991.

By 2018, the Woodville-West Torrens Football Club officially surpassed Woodville's total existence as it entered its 28th SANFL season, and interestingly, the club's on-field record read very similar to that of West Torrens prior to Woodville entering the competition in 1964.

Woodville-West Torrens entered a team in the SANFL Women's League in 2019 and, as of 2021 SANFL season, are the only club to have never won a wooden spoon

Premierships

After having merged only 3 years prior, Woodville-West Torrens claimed the Holy Grail of SANFL footy, The Thomas Seymour Hill Trophy, with a convincing 73-point victory over Norwood. It would, however, prove to be the Eagles only premiership success during 1994–2005 in which they lost 5 Grand Finals – 1994 to Port Adelaide and 2000, 2001, 2004 and 2005 all to Central District. After losing yet another Grand Final to their arch rivals in 2005, the Eagles bounced back and got their first premiership in 13 years, and after 6 attempts, with a thumping 76-point victory over the Bulldogs.

In 2011, the Eagles became the only club since the turn of the century to defeat Central District in two grand finals, with a thrilling 3-point win – 81 to 78 on 9 October 2011. The Eagles went in as the underdogs but coach Michael Godden (in only his second year with the team and in a senior coaching position) believed his Eagles could overcome the Dogs.

Ruckman Craig Parry was named the Jack Oatey Medalist for Best on Ground for 2011.

Godden became the third coach to win a Premiership for Woodville-West Torrens, following Bruce Winter (1993) and Ron Fuller (2006). He became the second to win one at his first attempt (Winter 1993).

The Eagles became the first side to win the Premiership from a Qualifying Final loss since Sturt did so in 1976, and the only club in the competition to have won Premierships in each of the last 3 decades.

In 2015 the Woodville West Torrens Football Club celebrated their 25th season in the SANFL, and dominated the competition in U/18s, Reserves and League, taking out each Minor Premiership (the only club to ever do so) dropping just 4 games across all 3 grades throughout the minor round season. The league team with a 16–2 record from their 18 games.

Each club progressed straight through to their respective Grand Finals, and the Reserves completed a remarkable undefeated season (first team to do so since West Torrens in 1919) to take out their 8th flag.
Unfortunately the League team were dealt with 3 major season ending injuries in their 2nd semi-final victory, ripping out their engine room including Magarey Medal Runner-up and eventual 2015 Club Champion Angus Rowntree, as well as number 1 ruckman Marc Borholm and former Reserves Magarey Medalist Angus Poole.

It proved too much to cover for the Eagles in the Grand Final, falling short to West Adelaide by 30 points. The U/18s also lost their decider.

It was a bitterly disappointing end for Michael Godden and his men after a near perfect season, cruelled by injury at the final hurdle.

The Jade Sheedy Era & Back-to-Back

Before the start of the 2020 SANFL season, the club hired a new coach: former Sturt premiership player and Magarey Medalist Jade Sheedy. In Sheedy's first year in charge, the club finished minor premiers and advanced to the 2020 SANFL Grand Final where the club overcame North Adelaide by 39 points to win their first premiership in 9 years. This was the first premiership against North Adelaide. West Torrens had previously played North Adelaide in the 1949 SANFL Grand Final.

During the 2021 SANFL season, the Eagles finished 2nd behind minor premiers Glenelg who had lost only one game all season. They defeated Glenelg in the 2021 SANFL Grand Final by a margin of 67 points to claim their 5th premiership and became only the second team all year to defeat Glenelg. In doing so, the club went back-to-back for the first time in their history. Not even West Torrens had managed the feat previously.

West Torrens won 4 Premierships pre-1991, in 1924, 1933, 1945 and 1953.

Player Development

In 2011, a study commissioned by the AFL identified Woodville-West Torrens as the most effective developer of AFL talent in the country. From 1998–2010, the Eagles had 19 selected at the AFL Draft.

Notable AFL Listed Players

 Matthew Pavlich
 Brian Lake
 Matthew Stokes
 Scott Camporeale
 Bernie Vince
 Stephen Sziller
 Jay Schulz
 Kent Kingsley
 Rhett Biglands
 Nathan Bock
 Luke Thompson
 Jared Petrenko
 Jarrad Redden

 Martin Frederick
 Justin Cicolella
 Sam Jacobs
 Riley Knight
 Luke Dunstan
 Tyson Stengle
 Jimmy Toumpas
 Brennan Cox
 Brodie Smith
 Matthew Broadbent

 Brett Burton
 Aaron Shattock
 Robert Shirley
 Paul Stewart
 Ken McGregor
 Jack Hayes
 Jared Polec
 Cameron Sutcliffe
 Harry Schoenberg
 Jack Lukosius
 Glenn Freeborn

Club details

Club song
The Woodville-West Torrens Football Club song is called "We're the mighty flying Eagles" and is to the tune of The Battle Hymn of the Republic

(Verse)

We're the mighty Eagles
And we always battle through
The mighty flying Eagles
Wearing Gold and Green and Blue
Sound the Siren, turn us loose
And watch the Feathers fly
And you'll see what we can do

(Chorus)

We're the mighty flying Eagles
We're the mighty flying Eagles
We're the mighty flying Eagles
In Gold and Green and Blue

(Home Run)

In Gold and Green and Blue

Coaches
1991–1992 – Neil Balme
1993–1997 – Bruce Winter *
1998–1999 – Mark Mickan
2000      – Paul Hamilton
2001–2009 – Ron Fuller *
2010-2018    – Michael Godden *
2019 - Sam Lonergan
2020 -  Jade Sheedy *

italics current coach
* Premiership Coach

Captains
1991–1994 – Peter Schwarz *
1995–2000 – Andrew Rogers
2001–2006 – Gavin Colville
2007      – Justin Cicolella *
2008–2011 – Mark McKenzie *
2012-2014 – Luke Powell
2015–2019 - Patrick Giuffreda & Luke Thompson
2020 - Luke Thompson *
italics current captain
* Premiership Captain (Justin Cicolella was acting captain for the 2006 Premiership)

Current playing list

Honours

Club achievements

League placings

1991 – 4th
1992 – 3rd
1993 – Premiers
1994 – 2nd
1995 – 8th
1996 – 4th
1997 – 7th
1998 – 6th
1999 – 3rd
2000 – 2nd

2001 – 2nd
2002 – 4th
2003 – 3rd
2004 – 2nd
2005 – 2nd
2006 – Premiers
2007 – 3rd
2008 – 6th
2009 – 4th
2010 – 3rd

2011 – Premiers
2012 – 5th
2013 – 4th
2014 – 5th
2015 – 2nd
2016 – 2nd
2017 - 3rd
2018 - 3rd*
2019 - 7th
2020 - Premiers
2021 - Premiers
2022 - 7th

Magarey Medallists
2021 – James Tsitas

Fos Williams Medallists
Presented to best on ground for South Australia in a State match
2012 – Adam Grocke (representing South Australia vs Western Australia)

Jack Oatey Medallists
Presented to best on ground in an SANFL Grand Final
1993 – Steven Sziller
2006 – Hayden Skipworth
2011 – Craig Parry
2020 – Jordan Foote
2021 - Jack Hayes

Reserves Magarey Medallists
1992 – Jason Sziller
1996 – Jason King
2003 – David Newett
2012 – Angus Poole
2015 – Matthew Appleton
2016 - Jake Comitogianni

Tomkins Medallists (U/19's)
1997 – Adam O'Hara
1999 – Greg Chapman
2008 – Shane Harris

McCallum-Tomkins Medallists (U/18's)
2013 – Paul Ventura
2018 - Kai Pudney

Bob Lee Medallists
Presented to best on ground in an SANFL Reserves Grand Final
2001 – Brett O'Hara
2004 – Luke Spehr
2013 – Byron Sumner
2014 – Sam Martyn
2015 – Ethan Haylock
2020 – Mitch Mead

Alan Stewart Medallists
Presented to best on ground in an SANFL U/18's Grand Final
2012 – Matthew Appelton
2013 – Malcolm Karpany
2018 - Jackson Mead
2019 - Michael Frederick
2021 - Adam D’Aloia

U16s Grand Final Medal
Presented to best on ground in an SANFL U/16's Grand Final
2022 - Tom Luck

Ken Farmer Medallists (SANFL Leading Goalkickers)
Scott Morphett: 99 goals (1991)
Mark Passador: 74 goals (2006)
Michael Wundke: 63 goals (2014)
James Rowe: 47 goals (2020)
Daniel Menzel: 51 goals (2022)

Bob Quinn Medalists
Presented to best on ground in an ANZAC Day match (Grand Final replay)
2005 – Luke Powell
2006 – Mark Passador
2016 – Jared Petrenko
2017 – Angus Poole
2021 – Sam Rowland

R.O. Shearman Medalists
Presented to best SANFL player as voted by League coaches
2000 – Gavin Colville
2006 – Justin Cicolella
2016 – Jared Petrenko
2022 – Riley Knight

Best and Fairest
1991 – Scott Morphett
1992 – Robert Pyman
1993 – Andrew Rogers
1994 – Jason Sziller
1995 – Andrew Rogers
1996 – Andrew Rogers
1997 – Steven Hall
1998 – Nick Pesch
1999 – Gavin Colville & Adam Pearce
2000 – Gavin Colville
2001 – Gavin Colville
2002 – Justin Cicolella
2003 – Justin Cicolella
2004 – Gavin Colville
2005 – Mark McKenzie
2006 – Mark McKenzie
2007 – Leigh Treeby
2008 – Mark McKenzie & Luke Powell
2009 – Mark McKenzie
2010 – Justin Cicolella
2011 – Mark McKenzie
2012 – Angus Rowntree
2013 – Phil Raymond
2014 – Scott Lewis
2015 - Angus Rowntree
2016 – Jared Petrenko
2017 - Joseph Sinor
2018 - James Boyd
2019 - Jordan Foote
2020 - Joseph Sinor
2021 - James Tsitas
2022 - Riley Knight

Life Governors
The highest individual honour that is bestowed by the club
Bob Hank
Lindsay Head
Fred Bills
Malcolm Blight
Andrew Payze
Andrew Rogers
Bob Simunsen
 Ron Fuller
 Justin Cicolella 
 Luke Powell

Club records
South Australian Premiers: 9 – 1924, 1933, 1945, 1953, 1993, 2006, 2011, 2020, 2021
South Australian Night Series Winners: 4 – 1983, 1988, 1993, 1994
Home Ground(s): Woodville Oval (Maughan Thiem Kia Oval) (1992–present)
Former Home Ground(s): Football Park (AAMI Stadium) (1991), Thebarton Oval (Adelaide Airport Stadium) (2012– 2014)
Record Attendance: 42,719 v Norwood at Football Park, 1993 SANFL Grand Final
Record Attendance Minor Round: 15,126 v Port Adelaide at Football Park, 1994 SANFL ANZAC Day
Record Night Attendance at Thebarton Oval: 4,566 v Port Adelaide, Round 1, 2012
Most Games: 266 by Justin Cicolella (1998–2012)
Most Goals in a Season: 99 by Scott Morphett in 1991
Most Goals for the Club: 312 by Mark Passador (2003–10)
Most Goals in a Game: 12 by Andrew Taylor vs North Adelaide in 1994
Most Years as Coach: 9 by Michael Godden (2010–18)
Most Premierships as Coach: 2 by Jade Sheedy (2020, 2021)
Most Years as Captain: 8 by Luke Thompson (2015–22)
Most Premierships as Captain: 2 by Luke Thompson (2020, 2021)
Most Best & Fairest Awards: 5 by Mark McKenzie (2005, 2006, 2008, 2009, 2011)
SANFL Magarey Medallists: James Tsitas (2021)
SANFL Ken Farmer Medallists: Scott Morphett (1991), Mark Passador (2006), Michael Wundke (2014), James Rowe (2020), Daniel Menzel (2022)
Highest Score: 30.14 (194) v North Adelaide in 1994
Longest Winning Run: 14 (1993–94 – last 7 games in 1993, first 7 games in 1994)
Longest Winning Run in a Season: 12 (2004)
Longest Losing Run: 8 (1997)

Home Grounds
The Woodville-West Torrens Eagles first home ground was SANFL league headquarters Football Park in their inaugural season of 1991. In 1992 the new club moved permanently to the Woodville Oval (former home of the Woodville Warriors). Due to Woodville Oval also being the home of the Woodville Cricket Club who play in the South Australian Grade Cricket League, the Eagles use West Torrens' former home ground Thebarton Oval as their pre-season training base. Thebarton, which had lights installed for night games since the 1950s (the lights were upgraded in 2011–12), is occasionally used as an alternative playing venue for the club, with the team having played a handful of games at the venue since 2006.

Football Park (AAMI Stadium) (1991)
Woodville Oval (Maughan Thiem Hyundai Oval) (1992—present)
Thebarton Oval (Adelaide Airport Stadium) (2006—present)

References

External links

 
 Full Points Footy History of The Eagles

Australian rules football clubs established in 1990
South Australian National Football League clubs
SANFL Women's League
Australian rules football clubs in South Australia
1990 establishments in Australia